Reedy Dam is a town in the Mallee and Mount Jeffcot wards in the Shire of Buloke, Victoria, Australia. There is a rural CFA station in Reedy Dam. The post office there opened in 1902 and was closed on 31 July 1929. There is a population of approximately 20 people in Reedy Dam (2017).

References